The 1999 Denmark Open in badminton was held in Vejle, from October 13 to October 17, 1999. It was a four-star tournament and the prize money was US$120,000.

Venue
Vejle Center, Denmark

Final results

References

Denmark Open
Denmark